Alexander Kushaev (born 8 March 1973 in Moscow, USSR) is a Russian film producer.

Biography 

Aleksandr Kushaev was born in Moscow on 8 March 1973. He started his career on television in 1996 as the correspondent of The Business Russia TV show on the RTR channel. Since 1997, he has worked as author and director of TV shows at Russia-1 (ex-RTR), NTV, and TV Centre. In 1998, he graduated from the High Courses for Scriptwriters and Film Directors as the director of documentary films.

From 1998 to 2019, Kushaev held senior positions at Film Broadcasting Service at Russia-1 channel, the flagship channel of All-Russia State Television and Radio Broadcasting Company (VGTRK). In 2012, he took part in the launch of the Russian Novel cable channel for VGTRK and became its senior producer. From 2015 till 2019, he was the Senior Producer of the Film Broadcasting Service of Russia-1 channel. In 2018, Kushaev was the jury member at the selection round of the International Emmy Awards.

Filmography 

Kushaev participated in the creation of over 500 films and TV projects. His filmography includes Serf, The Last Warrior, The Last Warrior 3, Tale in the Darkness, How I Ended This Summer, A Long and Happy Life, Living, The Painted Bird, Zuleikha Opens Her Eyes, The Bloody Lady, and Ekaterina. Some of the films and TV series above became notable box office successes.

Awards and nominations 

 2011 — Order of Friendship (for the significant contribution to the development of domestic television broadcasting)

Awards received by Kushaev's films

References

Links 

 

Russian film producers
Russian television people
1973 births
Living people